Saul S. Friedman (March 8, 1937 in Uniontown, Pennsylvania – March 31, 2013 in Canfield, Ohio) was an American historian.

Life 
Saul S. Friedman, son of Albert and Rebecca Friedman, came from a large Jewish family. He married Nancy Evans in 1964, they had three children, including the historian Jonathan C. Friedman.

Friedman graduated from Kent State University (BA) and received his PhD in history from Ohio State University. He was appointed Professor of Jewish and Middle East History at Youngstown State University in 1969. In 2000 he founded the YSU Judaic and Holocaust Studies program. In 2006 he retired.

Friedman was an anti-Semitism researcher and published on the Holocaust and the history of the Middle East. In addition to twelve books, he produced from the late 1980s documentaries, five of which were awarded regional Emmy Awards.

Books
Friedman authored twelve books.

Holocaust
No Haven for the Oppressed (1973).
Pogromchik (1976).
Amcha (1979).
The Oberammergau Passion Play (Southern Illinois University Press, 1984).
The Terezin Diary of Gonda Redlich (1992).
Holocaust Literature (1993). 
A History of the Holocaust (2004).

Middle East
Land of Dust (1982).
Without Future (1989).
A History of the Middle East (2006).

Jews in America
The Incident at Massena (1978).
Jews and the American Slave Trade (1998).

References

1937 births
2013 deaths
Youngstown State University faculty
Historians of the Holocaust
Jewish historians
Historians of Europe